Federico Secli (born 14 May 2002) is an Italian football player. He plays for Serie D club Albalonga.

Club career
He made his senior debut for Pordenone on 30 September 2020 in a Coppa Italia game against Casarano. He scored the final goal in a 3–0 victory. He made his Serie B debut on 6 March 2021 against Monza.

References

External links
 

2002 births
Sportspeople from Udine
Footballers from Friuli Venezia Giulia
Living people
Italian footballers
Association football forwards
Pordenone Calcio players
Serie B players
Serie D players